Tonghe County is under the administration of Harbin, the capital of Heilongjiang province, People's Republic of China, located on the northern (left) bank of the Songhua River.

Geography and climate
Tonghe County has a monsoon-influenced humid continental climate (Köppen Dwa/Dwb), with long, very dry, bitterly cold winters, very warm and humid summers, and short, rather dry spring and autumn in between. Its location in the Songhua River Valley at an elevation of  allows for cool air to pool in and around the county seat, depressing temperatures slightly as compared to Harbin. Close to 65% of the annual precipitation occurs from June to August. With monthly percent possible sunshine ranging from 46% in July to 66% in February, the area receives 2,413 hours of bright sunshine annually, with the latter half of winter being especially sunny.

Administrative divisions 
There are eight towns in the county:

Towns
Tonghe
Wuyapao
Qinghe
Nonghe
Fengshan
Xiangshun
Sanzhan
Fulin

Demographics

Transport
China National Highway 221
G1011 Harbin–Tongjiang Expressway

See also

References

External links
  Government site - 

Tonghe